Ann Philbin is an American museum director. Since 1999, she has been director of the Hammer Museum in Los Angeles; before this she was the director of the Drawing Center in New York City.

Early life and education
Philbin's parents were an artist and a lawyer in the John F. Kennedy administration. She received her B.A. in art history and B.F.A. in painting from the University of New Hampshire, Durham, in 1976 and her M.A. in museum studies/arts administration from New York University in 1982.

At the University of New Hampshire, Philbin was a member of the Gay Students Organization, which faced controversy when Governor of New Hampshire Meldrim Thomson Jr. threatened to cut university funding if the group refused to disband. In 1974, the United States Court of Appeals for the First Circuit in Boston upheld the decision made by the United States District Court for the District of New Hampshire, and this landmark case established the constitutional right for gay students groups to exist on campus.

Career
Prior to her arrival at the Hammer Museum, Philbin lived and worked in New York as an independent curator. She served as curator of the Ian Woodner Family Collection followed by a position at the Curt Marcus Gallery as an art dealer. Having acted as director of The Drawing Center in New York for nine years, Philbin was appointed Director of the Hammer Museum in Los Angeles, where she has remained for over twenty years. Philbin is one of ten leading art museum directors interviewed by Michael E. Shapiro, Director Emeritus of the High Museum of Art, in In Eleven Museums, Eleven Directors: Conversations on Art & Leadership on how the directors came into their leadership roles, the challenges they face, and what they see as the future of museums.

Directorship at The Drawing Center
From 1990 through 1999, Philbin served as director of The Drawing Center in New York, where she curated exhibitions of works on paper in addition to managing the institution's overall programming and administration. Philbin is credited with revitalizing the institution through a creative approach to exhibiting the medium of drawing, presenting work from established artists while also introducing lesser-known artists to The Drawing Center's audience. Along with these developments in the exhibition program, Philbin turned the space into a gathering center for community groups, implementing a series of monthly readings and other public events.

Directorship at the Hammer Museum
After Henry Hopkins retired in 1998, Philbin was appointed director of the Hammer Museum in 1999. Philbin oversees a complex group of art holdings, including collections amassed by Armand Hammer and UCLA's Murphy Sculpture Garden and Grunwald Center, a 45,000-piece graphic arts trove. The newest addition is a rapidly growing collection of contemporary art with 1,000 pieces in place, strongest in works on paper and Southern California art. Since Philbin became director in 1999, the museum’s annual operating budget has grown from $5 million to $22 million, and its staff from 35 to over 200. She is credited with re-energizing the institution and making it a "nexus of LA's arts community." Under Philbin's leadership, the Hammer has quadrupled its attendance to about 250,000 visitors per year.

Made in L.A.
In 2012, Philbin inaugurated the first biennial exhibition in Los Angeles, Made in L.A. Now in its fifth iteration, Made in L.A. celebrates emerging and under-recognized artists from Los Angeles with practices in an array of mediums. By commissioning local artists to create work specifically for the exhibition, the Hammer's signature biennial showcases the city's diversity.

Capital Campaign
In 2018 the Hammer announced a $180 million capital campaign in support of an ambitious transformation plan for the museum spaces. The majority of the funds will be used to expand exhibition and public areas, increasing gallery space by 60% and adding 20,000 square feet of public space. The renovation, a continuation of previous building projects by architect Michael Maltzan, will also include a revamped entrance at Wilshire and Westwood boulevards designed to maximize the Hammer's visual presence.

Personal life
Philbin is married to her longtime partner, Cynthia Wornham, a senior vice president at the Natural History Museum of Los Angeles County. They reside in a house designed by Buff, Smith and Hensman in Beverly Hills.

Awards and honors
From 2005 to 2012, Philbin was ranked in ArtReview's Power 100. In both 2018 and 2019, Philbin was included on Los Angeles Business Journal's LA500 list, a selection of 500 individuals chosen for their exceptional contributions to the community of business in Los Angeles.

In 2018, Philbin received an honor from the French Consulate of Los Angeles which elevated her to the rank of Officier in  National des Arts et des Lettres, received for presenting the work of French artists.

In 2020, Philbin was elected to the American Academy of Arts and Sciences. Founded in 1780, this honorary society celebrates contributions made to the arts and sciences and honors the individuals who apply this knowledge to the improvement of society.

References

American art curators
American women curators
Directors of museums in the United States
Women museum directors
University of New Hampshire alumni
New York University alumni
Living people
Year of birth missing (living people)
21st-century American women